Arthur Cyril Boyce (September 12, 1867 – August 4, 1942) was a Canadian politician.

Born in Wakefield, West Yorkshire, England, Boyce was educated at private educational institutions in Wakefield, York and Carlisle, England, and Osgoode Hall Law School, Toronto. A lawyer, he practised law in Port Arthur (1890–1892), Rat Portage (1893–1903) and in Sault Ste. Marie.

He represented the electoral district of Algoma West in the House of Commons of Canada from 1904 to 1917, during which time he became involved in the case of Angelina Napolitano, a Sault Ste. Marie woman who became the first in Canada to use the battered woman defence. He was a member of the Conservative Party.

He died in Toronto on August 4, 1942.

References

 
 The Canadian Parliament; biographical sketches and photo-engravures of the senators and members of the House of Commons of Canada. Being the tenth Parliament, elected November 3, 1904

Lawyers in Ontario
Members of the House of Commons of Canada from Ontario
Conservative Party of Canada (1867–1942) MPs
English emigrants to Canada
1867 births
1942 deaths